Mixture fraction is a quantity used in combustion studies that measures the mass fraction of one stream (usually the fuel stream) of a mixture formed by two feed streams, one the fuel stream and the other the oxidizer stream. Both the feed streams are allowed to have inert gases. The mixture fraction definition is usually normalized such that it approaches unity in the fuel stream and zero in the oxidizer stream. The mixture-fraction variable is commonly used as a replacement for the physical coordinate normal to the flame surface, in nonpremixed combustion.

Definition

Assume a two-stream problem having one portion of the boundary the fuel stream with fuel mass fraction  and another portion of the boundary the oxidizer stream with oxidizer mass fraction . In addition, assume there is no oxygen in the fuel stream and there is no fuel in the oxidizer stream. Let  be the mass of oxygen required to burn unit mass of fuel (for hydrogen gas,  and for  alkanes). Then the mixture fraction is defined as

where 

is the stoichiometry parameter, also known as the overall equivalence ratio. On the fuel-stream boundary,  and  since there is no oxygen in the fuel stream, and hence . Similarly, on the oxidizer-stream boundary,  and  so that . Anywhere else in the mixing domain, . The mixture fraction is a function of both the spatial coordinates  and the time , i.e., 

Within the mixing domain, there are level surfaces where fuel and oxygen are found to be mixed in stoichiometric proportion. This surface is special in combustion because this is where a diffusion flame resides.

.

Relation between local equivalence ratio and mixture fraction

This allows to define a local fuel-air equivalence ratio 

The local equivalence ratio is an important quantity for partially premixed combustion. The relation between local equivalence ratio and mixture fraction is given by

The stoichiometric mixture fraction  defined earlier is the location where the local equivalence ratio .

Scalar dissipation rate

In turbulent combustion, a quantity called the scalar dissipation rate  with dimensional units of that of an inverse time is used to define a characteristic diffusion time. Its definition is given by

where  is the diffusion coefficient of the scalar.

Liñán's mixture fraction

Amable Liñán introduced a modified mixture fraction in 1991 that is appropriate for systems where the fuel and oxidizer have different Lewis numbers.

where 

The stoichiometric mixture fraction  is given by

.

References

Fluid dynamics
Combustion